Horacio Mendizábal (1847–1871) was an Argentine poet, translator and activist.

Life
Horacio Mendizábal was born to an Afro-Argentine upper-class family in Buenos Aires, the son of Rosendo Mendizábal, a member of the Chamber of Deputies of Buenos Aires and one of the earliest black politicians in Argentina. Publishing his first volume of poetry as a teenager, he became increasingly concerned with issues of racial equality and national independence. He died, aged 24, while tending to the sick in the 1871 yellow fever epidemic.

His son was the pianist and composer Rosendo Mendizábal.

Works
 Primeros Versos [First Verses], 1865
 Horas de meditación [Hours of Meditation], 1869

References

1847 births
1871 deaths
19th-century Argentine poets
Writers from Buenos Aires
Afro-Argentine people